Ilex integerrima ("Soundest holly") is a species of holly in the family Aquifoliaceae, native from Brazil and typically found in its Atlantic Forest vegetation. It is sometimes used as an adulterant for maté.

References

integerrima
Endemic flora of Brazil
Flora of the Atlantic Forest
Plants described in 1861